Andriy Honchar (born 15 March 1985) is a retired Ukrainian professional footballer. He spent most of his career playing for Dnepr Mogilev in Belarus.

External links
 
 

1985 births
Living people
Ukrainian footballers
Association football defenders
Ukrainian expatriate footballers
Expatriate footballers in Belarus
Expatriate footballers in Finland
FC Dnepr Mogilev players
Kajaanin Haka players